Anathallis clandestina is a species of orchid plant native to Venezuela.

References 

clandestina
Flora of Venezuela